Gould Academy is a private, co-ed, college preparatory boarding and day school founded in 1836 and located in the small town of Bethel, Maine, United States.

History
In 1835 citizens of Bethel, Maine, formed an organization as trustees of the Bethel High School. A hall was fitted up for a schoolroom, and N. T. True was employed as principal. Encouraged by their success, the trustees reorganized and obtained a charter for an Academy, which by act of the Legislature on January 27, 1836, was incorporated as Bethel Academy. A building was erected, Isaac Randall was the first instructor, and the school opened for its first term on the second Wednesday of September, 1836.

Bethel Academy also accepted its first tuition-paying students in 1836, both locals and boarders. Reverend Daniel Gould left his $842 fortune to the school when he died in 1843. Gould stipulated that the school be named for him; from then on it was known as Gould's Academy and eventually Gould Academy.

In 1921, plans to build the Bingham Gymnasium were announced by then president Frank E. Hanscom. In 1933, construction began on Hanscom Hall. In 1936, the Academy earned accreditation by the New England Association of Schools and Colleges.

William Bingham II, who came to Bethel from Cleveland for John George Gehring's medical care, was a major school benefactor from the 1930s to his death in 1955 and thereafter via the Bingham Betterment Fund. Since the town of Bethel lacked a public high school, all local children were educated at Gould until 1969, when Telstar High School opened.

Much of the school's history is preserved by the Museums of the Bethel Historical Society, which has had stewardship of the Gould Academy Archives since 2014.

Academics

Subjects taught include English, History, Math, Science, Computer Science, Performing Arts, Visual Arts, Spanish, Mandarin. Gould offers honors and AP classes and courses in design-thinking, fabrication, and robotics related to the school's makerspace, the Marlon Family IDEAS Center.

Gould operates on a trimester system, and students typically enroll in five to six courses per trimester. Class periods are affectionately known as "dots" (periods), and have a fixed schedule changing between four and three classes a day. The fall and spring term schedules include a half day every week on Wednesday, a late start every Thursday, and occasional Saturday classes. The Winter term schedule is based on half days Tuesday through Friday to make time for athletics, mainly the On-Snow Competition programs.

The Academic Skills Center is a special academic support program where students work closely with a learning specialist to develop learning strategies and skills.

Programming

Athletics
Gould's high school teams compete in the MAISAD league of the New England Preparatory School Athletic Council. Most sports also branch outside of the league and conference. Fall Sports include Cross Country Running, Equestrian, Field Hockey, Golf, Mountain Biking, Soccer, the Outing Club, and Yearbook. Winter Sports include Basketball, Snowboarding (competitive and not), Alpine Skiing (competitive and not), Freestyle Skiing, Nordic Skiing, Learning to Ski, Rugrats, and the Outing Club. Spring sports are Baseball, Equestrian, Lacrosse, Road Cycling, Skateboarding, Softball, Tennis and the Outing Club.

On-Snow Competition Program
The On-Snow Competition Program includes Alpine, Snowboard, Freestyle, and Nordic Skiing. The program is designed to prepare athletes to compete at the highest levels in every age group. A winter term is available for 8th grade students, from Thanksgiving through March.

Special class schedules and flexibility are available for students competing in the program, especially during the winter.

Four Point
At the end of the winter trimester, each Class pursues a week-long assignment called Four Point, designed to emphasize experiential learning outside of the classroom. Ninth grade students travel abroad as a class, Tenth grade students engage in community service on or near campus, Eleventh grade students take a class winter camping trip in the White Mountains of New Hampshire, and Twelfth grade students take on an independent project.

Campus
 

Gould's 436 acre campus is located in the town of Bethel, Maine, just on the Western edge of "Bethel Village". Bethel sits in the Androscoggin River Valley, with the Sunday River Ski Resort 6 miles up the road and New Hampshire's White Mountains about 20 miles to the west.

Academic facilities

 Hanscom Hall
 Main academic building
 Constructed in 1933, Renovated multiple times over the years
 Marlon Family IDEAS Center (B1)
 Newly added in 2016 as part of the basement floor renovation
 Wood Shop
 Digital fabrication shop
 Class collaboration space
 Student study/cafe area
 Campus store
 Sanborn Family Library (1F)
 Renovated in 2012
 Meeting rooms
 Designated quiet & casual study areas
 Photography studio
 Academics Skills Center (2F)
 College Counselling Office (2F)
 Areas of Study
 English
 History
 English Studies Program
 World Languages
 Visual Arts
 McLaughlin Science Center
 Science & Mathematics building
 Constructed in 2002
 Labs: Physics, Chemistry, Biology
 Trustees Auditorium (1F): 56-seat auditorium for smaller community events
 Facilities: server room, greenhouse
 Owen Art Gallery
 Visual Arts building
 Exhibition space, printing shop, metal design shop, blacksmith shop, workspace
 Bingham Hall
 Auditorium for morning assemblies and other community events
 Performing Arts building
 Constructed in 1921, Renovated in 1963
 Band room (B1)
 William Bingham Gym (1F)
 Music Classrooms (1F, 2F)

Housing facilities 

 Davidson Hall
 Named after Sidney W. Davidson, 4th Headmaster
 Boys' Dormitory
 Constructed in 1971
 First Floor, Second Floor, Second Floor
 Room Types: Single, Double, Quad
 Community Color: Orange
 Holden Hall
 Named after Liberty Emery Holden, Class of 1853
 Boys' Dormitory
 Constructed in 1939, Renovated in 2019
 Room Types: Single, Double, Triple
 Basement Floor, First Floor, Second Floor
 Basement Floor used for on-snow athletes 
 Community Color: Black
 Gehring Hall
 Named after Marian True Gehring
 Girls' Dormitory
 Constructed in 1927, Renovated in 1998
 Room Types: Single, Double
 Basement Floor, First Floor, Second Floor, Third Floor, Fourth Floor
 The basement floor used to be the school cafeteria until Ordway Dining Hall was built in 1998
 Community Color: Pink

Athletic facilities

Farnsworth Field House: Farnsworth is a multi-purpose complex that is home to Lombard Basketball Court, a fitness and weight-training center, an athletic training room, a trampoline room, an indoor skate park, two tennis courts, and a team room. Outdoors, there are four tennis courts, four full-sized athletic fields, an artificial turf field, baseball and softball diamonds, and an 18-hole golf course at the Bethel Inn Resort.

Paul Kailey Competition Center: The On Snow Competition programs train at Sunday River, at the school's own competition center near Barker Lodge.

There are also 40 km of trails on campus for running, mountain biking, and groomed for Nordic Skiing in the winter. These trails also connect to a second network of trails at the Bethel Inn Resort.

Gould people

Students
About 250 students attend Gould. 45% of the student body come from Maine; 22% of the student body are local day-students. 26% of Gould's student body is international, while 15% of students come from New England states other than Maine and 14% come from US States outside of New England. Domestic students of color represent 5% of the community. About 30% of students compete in the On-Snow Competition program.

In the Class of 2011, 43 students (63% of the class) took 134 AP exams by the end of their junior and senior years combined. 56% earned a 3 or better, and 34% earned a 4 or 5. 99% of the graduating class matriculates at four-year colleges and universities.

Headmasters

Notable alumni

References

External links
Gould Academy

Private high schools in Maine
Boarding schools in Maine
Educational institutions established in 1836
Schools in Oxford County, Maine
Co-educational boarding schools
Bethel, Maine
1836 establishments in Maine